Samarium bromide may refer to:

 Samarium(II) bromide (samarium dibromide), SmBr2
 Samarium(III) bromide (samarium tribromide), SmBr3